Tax Collector is a 1997 Russian crime thriller film directed by Oleg Fomin.

Plot 
He is a tax collector and sees the future. He is sent to one place where the impossible must be completed and he copes with the task until she appears. He has to make a difficult choice.

Cast 
 Oleg Fomin as He
 Anna Molchanova as She
 Mikhail Gluzsky as Bayun, Witch doctor
 Aleksandr Porokhovshchikov as Potocky
 Andrei Bubashkin as Sedoy
 Juozas Budraitis as Oleg Aleksandrovich
 Vladimir Sichkar as Auctioneer
 Aleksandr Timoshkin as Valentin
 Aleksey Zharkov as Novitskiy
 Vitaliy Bykov as Secretary

References

External links 
 

1997 films
1990s Russian-language films
Russian crime thriller films
1997 crime thriller films